Immethridine is a histamine agonist selective for the H3 subtype.

References

Histamine agonists
Imidazoles
4-Pyridyl compounds